Abutilon oxycarpum, known as flannel weed, straggly lantern-bush, and small-leaved abutilon, is a malvaceous plant native to eastern Australia. It is found on hillsides or floodplains on red sand and limestone.

Flannel weed was first described by Ferdinand von Mueller as Sida oxycarpa in 1860.

Description
The leaves of Abutilon oxycarpum are heart-shaped with fairly obvious veins. The leaf margins are toothed and slightly hairy and the stems are hairy. It flowers from May to September or October.

References

oxycarpum
Plants described in 1860
Taxa named by Ferdinand von Mueller